Ranunculus trivedii is a flowering plant in the buttercup family Ranunculaceae. It is one of the highest altitude flowering plants in the world.

Description
Ranunculus trivedii grows as a perennial herb. It bears solitary yellow flowers. The plant flowers and fruits from June to August.

Distribution and habitat
Ranunculus trivedii grows naturally in Himalayan India, Pakistan, Nepal, Bhutan and Tibet. Along with Solms-laubachia himalayensis, it is the highest altitude flowering plant on record.

References

trivedii
Flora of West Himalaya
Flora of Nepal
Flora of East Himalaya
Flora of Pakistan
Flora of Tibet